The following is a list of episodes of the American fantasy-drama series Beauty and the Beast. Starring Linda Hamilton, Ron Perlman, Roy Dotrice and Jo Anderson. Beauty and the Beast aired from September 25, 1987 to August 4, 1990 on CBS, for a total of 56 episodes.

Overview

Episodes

Season 1: 1987–88

Season 2: 1988–89

Season 3: 1989–90

References

External links
 
 

Lists of American crime drama television series episodes
Lists of American romance television series episodes